Gateway Casinos and Entertainment is a Canadian gaming and entertainment operator. It operates 23 casinos in British Columbia, Alberta, and Ontario. The corporate offices of Gateway Casinos and Entertainment are located in Burnaby, British Columbia. It is owned by The Catalyst Capital Group Inc., a private equity investment firm founded in 2002.

History
Gateway Casinos & Entertainment Limited is one of the largest casino and entertainment companies in Western Canada and has grown from 2 facilities with 150 employees to 12 facilities with over 3,000 employees.

Properties include The Grand Villa Casino & Convention Centre Burnaby, Starlight Casino New Westminster, Cascades Resort Casino Langley, The Lake City Casinos (Vernon, Kamloops, Kelowna & Penticton) in the Okanagan, The Baccarat and Palace Casinos in Edmonton, the Chances Community Gaming Centres in Squamish, Mission, Kamloops and Newton Bingo in Surrey.

Starting in 1992, Gateway Casinos has provided operational services for casinos in the Greater Vancouver Regional District of British Columbia. In April 1992, Gateway Casinos acquired two casino operations in the Vancouver area: a 5,000 square foot facility on the second floor of the Mandarin Centre in Vancouver’s Chinatown and a smaller 4,000 square foot operation on the top floor of the Royal Towers Hotel in New Westminster, BC.

In March 1994, Gateway Casinos purchased a third casino, located in Maple Ridge, British Columbia with the intention of relocation in the future, which ultimately became Gateway’s Burnaby Casino.

June 1994 saw the Gateway relocation of the Vancouver casino from the small premises on the second floor of the Mandarin Centre to newly renovated premises in the same building. At this time, Mandarin Centre was the largest casino in British Columbia. In January 1996, Gateway Casinos relocated its operation in New Westminster from the top floor to expanded premises within the hotel.

Gateway Casinos ceased operating the casino in Maple Ridge in November 1996. The new operation was opened on the second floor of the parkade across from the now Grand Villa Casino in Burnaby, British Columbia.

November 1999 saw the Gateway acquisition of the Palace Casino (now  Starlight Casino) in Edmonton, Alberta where an extensive renovation which more than doubled the size of the facility, was substantially completed in October 2001.

The year 2002 was pivotal for Gateway due to the acquisition of the Baccarat Casino in Edmonton, Alberta, in June and the August purchase of the Lake City Casinos in Penticton, Kelowna, Kamloops and Vernon.

In May 2005 Gateway Casinos opened the Cascades Casino in the heart of Langley, British Columbia which brought about a new era of gaming for the company, boasting over 60,000 square feet of gaming space, 77-room hotel and more than 25,000 square feet of convention space operated by Coast Hotels & Resorts Limited.

The Starlight Casino and Grand Villa Casino were opened in 2007 and 2008 respectively and are currently operating as Gateway Casinos & Entertainment Limited’s flagship properties.
In 2011 Gateway Casinos & Entertainment Limited purchased three existing Community Gaming Centres located in Squamish, Mission and the Newton Surrey area. In April 2015 Gateway Casinos & Entertainment revealed its plans to build brand new casino located in the Edmonton Arena District.

In December 2015 Gateway casinos bought Playtime Gaming Inc. expanding their properties with 4 new CGC (community gaming centers) and 2 commercial bingo halls making them the largest casino company in British Columbia.

In December 2016, Gateway casinos purchased 11 Casinos from OLG in Ontario ranging from Thunder Bay to London with rights to build in Kenora and North Bay hereby now employing 6000+ people and making its way into the Ontario market.

In March 2018, Gateway was selected as the service provider for OLG's Central Gaming Bundle, which includes management of Casino Rama and slot operations at Georgian Downs, and the rights to build a new casino in Collingwood or Wasaga Beach. Wasaga Beach was selected as a site, and the Wasaga Playtime Casino opened on November 23, 2022.

Properties

Western Canada
Baccarat Casino (Edmonton) (closed 2016)
Cascades Casino, Hotel and Convention Centre (Langley City)
Cascades Casino, Hotel and Convention Centre (Delta) (opened September 2022)
Grand Villa Casino (Burnaby)
Grand Villa Casino Edmonton (Edmonton)
Playtime Casino (Kelowna)
Lake City Casinos
Kamloops Casino (Kamloops)
Penticton Casino (Penticton)
Vernon Casino (Vernon)
Starlight Casino former Palace Casino (Edmonton)
Starlight Casino (New Westminster)
Chances Mission (Mission)
Chances Squamish (Squamish)
Newton Community Gaming Centre (Surrey)
Chances Abbotsford
Chances Campbell River
Chances Courtney
Langley Bingo
Chances Kamloops

Eastern Canada
Thunder Bay
Sault Ste Marie
Sudbury
London
Point Edward
Woodstock
Dresden (closed)
Clinton
Hanover
Innisfil
Casino Rama
Chatham 
Wasaga Beach (opened November 2022)

References

External links
 Official company website

Gambling companies of Canada
Privately held companies of Canada
Gambling companies established in 2002
2002 establishments in British Columbia
Companies based in Burnaby